Cagliari was a province in the autonomous island region of Sardinia, Italy and its capital city was Cagliari.

There were 71 comuni (singular: comune) in the province .

The historical province was suppressed by the 2016 Regional Decree Province of Cagliari and replaced by the Metropolitan City of Cagliari.

Geography
The valley of Piscinamanna is in the province.

Major comuni
As of June 30, 2005, the major comuni by population was:

Government

List of presidents of the province of Cagliari

Provincial elections
The Democratic Party (PD) is a social-democratic political party in Italy, with The People of Freedom (PdL), it is one of the two major parties of the current Italian party system.

External links

 Official website

 
Cagliari